A media luz los tres is a 1958 Mexican film directed by Julián Soler. It was written by Luis Alcoriza, adapted from the play by Miguel Mihura.

Cast
Arturo de Córdova
Lilia Prado
María Elena Marqués
Martha Roth
Sofía Álvarez	
Wolf Ruvinskis	 
Guillermo Orea	 
Pedro de Aguillón
Luis Aragón	
Carlota Solares	
José Peña		
Rosa María Moreno		
Carlos Martínez Baena	 
Luis Otero		
Silvia Carrillo

References

External links
 

1958 films
Mexican romantic comedy-drama films
1950s Spanish-language films
1950s Mexican films